Capitimitta is a genus of trematodes in the family Haploporidae.

Species
Capitimitta costata Pulis & Overstreet, 2013
Capitimitta darwinensis Pulis & Overstreet, 2013

References

Haploporidae